The Hamburg-Amerikanische Packetfahrt-Aktien-Gesellschaft (HAPAG), known in English as the Hamburg America Line, was a transatlantic shipping enterprise established in Hamburg, in 1847. Among those involved in its development were prominent citizens such as Albert Ballin (Director General), Adolph Godeffroy, Ferdinand Laeisz, Carl Woermann, August Bolten, and others, and its main financial backers were Berenberg Bank and H. J. Merck & Co. It soon developed into the largest German, and at times the world's largest, shipping company, serving the market created by German immigration to the United States and later, immigration from Eastern Europe. On 1 September 1970, after 123 years of independent existence, HAPAG merged with the Bremen-based North German Lloyd to form Hapag-Lloyd AG.

History

Ports served

In the early years, the Hamburg America Line exclusively connected European ports with North American ports, such as Hoboken, New Jersey, or New Orleans, Louisiana. With time, however, the company established lines to all continents. The company built a large ocean liner terminal at Cuxhaven, Germany, in 1900. Connected directly to Hamburg by a dedicated railway line and station, the HAPAG Terminal at Cuxhaven served as the major departure point for German and European immigrants to North America until 1969 when ocean liner travel ceased. Today it serves as a museum and cruise ship terminal.

Atlas Service
The Atlas Service sailed from New York to Jamaica, Haiti, Colombia, Central America. The service was described as a way to "escape the rigors of Northern winters" through taking a Caribbean cruise and was promoted to tourists. The ships Altai, Sarnia, Sibiria, Alleghany, Alene, Adirondack, Valdivia, and Graecia provided this service in 1906.

Notable journeys
In 1858, its liner  sank, killing 449 people. In 1891, the cruise of the Augusta Victoria in the Mediterranean and the Near East from 22 January to 22 March, with 241 passengers including Albert Ballin and wife, is often stated to have been the first passenger cruise. Christian Wilhelm Allers published an illustrated account of it as "Bakschisch". In 1897, its steamer Arcadia was wrecked on the rocks off Newfoundland. In 1900, 1901 and 1903 its liner  won the Blue Riband taking the prize from the Kaiser Wilhelm der Grosse. In 1906 Prinzessin Victoria Luise ran aground off the coast of Jamaica. No people died by the grounding; however, the ship's captain committed suicide after getting all the passengers safely off the ship. In 1912, its liner SS Amerika was the first ship to warn  of icebergs.

HAPAG's general director, Albert Ballin, believed that safety, size, comfort and luxury would always win out over speed. Thus he conceived the three largest liners yet to be built, named ,  and Bismarck.

First World War
The Imperator and the Vaterland were briefly in service before the First World War. In 1914, the Vaterland was caught in port at Hoboken, New Jersey at the outbreak of World War I and interned by the United States. She was seized, renamed Leviathan after the declaration of war on Germany in 1917, and served for the duration and beyond as a troopship. In 1917, its liner Allemannia was "torpedoed by German submarine near Alicante"; two people were lost.

Postwar reparations
After the war, the Vaterland/Leviathan was retained by the Americans as war reparations. In 1919 Vaterlands sister ships – Imperator and the unfinished Bismarck – were handed over to the allies as war reparations to Britain. They were sold to the Cunard Line and White Star Line respectively, and renamed Berengaria and Majestic. A ship chain in Mountain Lakes, New Jersey is identified by the historic society as belonging to either the Vaterland or Imperator. It was acquired in 1921, likely during refurbishments, and now lines a portion of the Boulevard.

In 1939, the HAPAG liner  was unable to find a port in Cuba, the United States, or Canada willing to accept the more than 950 Jewish refugees on board and had to return to Europe. On 9 April 1940, when German warships attacked Kristiansand, Norway, during Operation Weserübung (the opening assault of the Norwegian Campaign), the HAPAG freighter  sailed into the crossfire between the warships and Norwegian coastal artillery. She was holed and sunk, and her crew briefly became prisoners of war.

Later years
The Hamburg America Line lost almost the entirety of its fleet twice, as a result of World Wars I and II. In 1970, the company merged with its longstanding rival, Norddeutscher Lloyd of Bremen, to establish the present-day company Hapag-Lloyd.

Fleet List

See also
 Holland America Line
 Norwegian America Line
 Scandinavian America Line
 Swedish American Line

References

External links

Fleet information 
The history of the Hamburg-America Line
Historic photos of Hoboken and Hamburg America Line ports
Passenger Lists from the Hamburg-Amerika Linie GG Archives
Hamburg-Amerika Line ships This collection contains 16 photographs depicting ship interior and exterior views of Hamburg-Amerika Line's luxury passenger ships Augusta Victoria, Columbia and Normannia by Louis Koch, Bremen
 
Hamburg-American Line History and Ephemera GG Archives

 
Shipping companies of Germany
Transatlantic shipping companies
Companies based in Hamburg
Port of New York and New Jersey
Transport companies disestablished in 1970
1970 disestablishments in West Germany
Transport companies established in 1847
German companies established in 1847